Akkarai Kottagam  is a village in the Mannargudi taluk of Tiruvarur district in Tamil Nadu, India.

Demographics 

As per the 2001 census, Akkarai Kottagam had a population of 1,943 with 943 males and 1,000 females. The sex ratio was 1060. The literacy rate was 69.53.

References 

 

Villages in Tiruvarur district